Solid Foundation is the debut compilation mixtape by the record label Quality Control Music. It was released on February 3, 2014. It features artists from the label including Migos, Rich The Kid, Skippa Da Flippa, Jose Guapo, Johnny Cinco, Lil Duke, Chill Will, Dirty Dave, Cartie, and Losie. The mixtape has only one outside appearance, from Gucci Mane. Its production was handled by Murda Beatz, Mercy, Dee Money, 30 Roc, Spiffy, Zaytoven, Hittman Traxx, Butla, Metro Boomin, Will A Fool, Young CEO and JB Did It, among others.

Background
The mixtape was scheduled to drop during Super Bowl Sunday, but it was delayed by several hours.

Promotion
Before the mixtape's release, a promotional vlog directed by Keemotion was released.

Reception
Jake Rohn for BET wrote, "For fans who enjoy the hard-hitting beats that have established the South in the mainstream, Solid Foundation is exactly what  name suggests, but as a group, Quality Control Music still has a ways to go if they're looking to keep building."

Track listing

References

Quality Control Music albums
2014 mixtape albums
Record label compilation albums